Bnot Eilat is an Israeli women's football club from Eilat competing in the Israeli Second League and the Israeli Women's Cup.

History
The club was established in 2010 by footballer Ann Levy and entered the league's second division in 2012. The club qualified to the promotion group of the league, but finished fourth. The next season the club missed on promotion once again, as it finished third in the league.

In the cup, the club is yet to win a game. In its first season the club competed in the Second Division League Cup, and was beaten 0–1 by F.C. Kafr Yasif. The club entered the main competition the next season, and was beaten 0–17 by top division’s Maccabi Kishronot Hadera, the club's worst defeat ever. In the 2014–15 competition the club met Maccabi Be'er Sheva in the first round, and was beaten 0–6.

2014-15 squad

References

External links
 Bnot Eilat Israeli Football Association 

Women's football clubs in Israel
Association football clubs established in 2010
Sport in Eilat